This is a list of monuments in Chișinău.

Alley of Classics 

Alley of Classics is a sculptural Complex found in Central Park Ștefan cel Mare Chișinău. Busts of red granite dedicated to writers of Romanian literature and politicians of Moldova.

Stephan the Great's statue 
Ștefan cel Mare's monument from Chișinău is by sculptor Alexandru Plămădeală (1888-1940) and architect Alexandru Bernardazzi. The monument was inaugurated in 1927 in Public Garden of Chișinău.

Vasile Alecsandri's monument 
Dedicated to classic poet and dramatist of Romanian literature Vasile Alecsandri. It is made from bronze and is in front of the National Library of Moldova.

Ion and Doina Aldea-Teodorovici's monument 
Dedicated to Artist Emeriti of Republic Moldova Ion and Doina Aldea-Teodorovici.

Ion Creangă's monument 
Dedicated to the writer of classics Romanian literature Ion Creangă. It was installed in 1982 at Pedagogical University of Chișinău.

Capitoline Wolf from Chișinău 

Capitoline Wolf (Lupa Capitolina) from Chișinău, was given by the municipality of Rome in first years after union of Bessarabia and Bucovinei with România, respective in 1921 and was installed in front of building country advice. În time of sovietic occupation, was melted, find treated like symbol of imperialism. After first years of independence a Republica Moldova was installed a companion in front of “History museum of Republica Moldova” from Chișinău, which once with coming to power of Communist Faction from Moldova, was dissembled. In 2009 was reinstalled a second companion at one time with coming to power Alliance for European integration.

Grigore Kotovski's statue 
Grigore Kotovski's statue from Chișinău was the first equestrian statue from the Moldavian SSR Soviet period. It is for the Communist hero of civil war from Russia, Grigore Kotovski.
 geographic coordinates:

Memorial Complex Eternity 

 Eternity Complex was high on 9 May 1975.
 Geografic coordinates:

Fighter for Soviet power 
 Fight for Soviet power was installed in 1966, in front of Gaudeamus cinema. 
Soviet monument. Sculptors: A. Miko, I. Poniatowski, L. Fitov. 
 Geografic coordinates:

Mikhail Kalinin's monument 
 Mikhail Kalinin's monument was high in 1977, to lyes way for today.
Sovietic monument.

Lenin's monument 
Sovietic monument. Mounted in the front of Government House in Central Square on 11 October 1949, before the anniversary of 25 years from the creation of Moldovan SSR. In 1991 the monument was moved on the territory of exhibition centre "MoldExpo".

Bibliography 
 Moldova monuments (Chisinau, 1969), p. 10,31
 Vladimir bulat - Lazăr Dubinovschi - in album «Master bassarabian fromcentury XX» (ED.ARC,Chișinău,2004).

 
Chișinău
Chișinău